This is a list of pals battalions (also called "service" or "locally raised" battalions) of the British Army during the First World War.  Pre-war Territorial Force (T.F.) battalions have not been included, although they too usually recruited from a specific area or occupation.  The 69 line                infantry regiments formed 142 locally raised battalions and 68 local reserve battalions.  The Guards Regiments and the regiments formed only from Territorial Force battalions did not form pals battalions.

History
Lord Kitchener was one of the few people in 1914 to realise that the First World War was not going to be a short one; he believed that it would last three years and would require an army of 70 divisions.  He eschewed the Territorial Forcepartly due to the limitations imposed by its terms of service but also due to the poor impression he formed when observing the French Territorials in the Franco-Prussian Warand did not make use of the framework envisioned by Haldane's Reforms.  He launched his appeal for 100,000 volunteers on 7 August 1914 to form a first New Army of six divisions (and support units) and within a few days this target had been reached; by the end of September, half a million volunteers had come forward to form the New Armies.

Each of the 69 line infantry regiments raised one battalion for the First (K1) and for the Second New Armies (K2) designated as "service" battalions and numbered after the existing Territorial Force battalions of their parent regiments.  This rigid structure did not take account of the differing ability of regiments to raise troops based upon the population of their recruiting areas.  Therefore, the Third New Army (K3) had a much higher proportion of battalions from the more populous north of England, notably Cheshire, Lancashire, Yorkshire, Durham and Northumberland.  The Fourth New Army (K4) was formed from men of the Reserve and Special Reserve battalions which were over establishment.  Originally formed into the 30th35th Divisions, these were broken up so the battalions could train recruits and send drafts to the first three New Armies.

While the first four New Armies were being raised, a number of "service" battalions were also being raised by committees in cities and towns, and by other organizations and individuals.  These units were recruited on a more narrow basis than usual, such as men who worked in a specific occupation or at a certain business, and were popularly known as "pals battalions".  These were housed, clothed and fed by their committees until the War Office took them over in 1915 and the raisers' expenses were refunded.  These units formed the Fifth and Sixth New Armies (later called the new Fourth and Fifth New Armies when the original Fourth New Army was broken up).

The locally recruited battalions also formed depot companies and in 1915 these were grouped into "reserve" battalions to provide reinforcements for their parents.  They became part of the Training Reserve on 1 September 1916.

Units

The recruitment of pals battalions was confined to the 69 line infantry regiments of the British Army. The Guards Regiments and regiments formed only from Territorial Force battalions did not form any pals battalions.  Amongst the line infantry regiments, there was considerable variation in the number of battalions recruited, depending upon the population of the regiment's recruiting areas.  No pals battalions were raised in the more rural areas of England, the Scottish Highlands, or Ireland.

The Northumberland Fusiliers raised the largest number of pals battalions (twelve) of any regiment, followed by ten raised by the Royal Fusiliers, nine for the Welch Regiment, nine for the Middlesex Regiment, and nine for the Manchester Regiment. The Royal Irish Rifles had nine battalions raised in a similar fashion from the Ulster Volunteer Force.

In all, 142 "service" battalions and 68 "reserve" battalions were formed.

Formations

The pals battalions formed the bulk of the infantry for the divisions of the Fifth New Army (30th, 31st, 32nd, 33rd, 34th, and 35th) and the Sixth New Army (36th (Ulster), 37th, 38th (Welsh), 39th, 40th, and 41st).  The exceptions were:
 the 37th Division was made up of 13 Army Troops battalions from the First (2), Second (2) and Third (9) New Armies.
 the 14th (Service) Battalion, Princess Louise's (Argyll and Sutherland Highlanders) was raised as part of the original 33rd Division of the Fourth New Army.  When the Fourth New Army was broken up, it was reassigned to the 118th Brigade, 39th Division.

A handful of battalions served away from the Fifth and Sixth New Army divisions:
 10th (Service) Battalion, Royal Fusiliers (City of London Regiment) (Stockbrokers) was assigned to the 54th Brigade, 18th (Eastern) Division (Second New Army)
 25th (Service) Battalion, Royal Fusiliers (City of London Regiment) (Frontiersmen) served in the East African Campaign from May 1915 to the end of 1917
 21st (Service) Battalion, Prince of Wales's Own (West Yorkshire Regiment) (Wool Textile Pioneers) as Pioneers in the Regular 4th Division
 11th (Service) Battalion, Leicestershire Regiment (Midland Pioneers) as Pioneers in the Regular 6th Division
 13th (Service) Battalion, Cheshire Regiment was locally raised but was assigned to the 74th Brigade, 25th Division (Third New Army)
 13th (Service) Battalion, Worcestershire Regiment (Severn Valley Pioneers) as Pioneers in the 63rd (Royal Naval) Division
 10th (Service) Battalion, Duke of Cornwall's Light Infantry (Cornwall Pioneers) as Pioneers in the Regular 2nd Division
 23rd (Service) Battalion, Welsh Regiment (Welsh Pioneers) as Pioneers in the Regular 28th Division
 26th (Service) Battalion, Duke of Cambridge's Own (Middlesex Regiment) (3rd Public Works Pioneers) as Pioneers in the Regular 27th Division
 20th (Service) Battalion, King's Royal Rifle Corps (British Empire League Pioneers) as Pioneers in the Regular 3rd Division
 22nd (Service) Battalion, Durham Light Infantry (3rd County Pioneers) as Pioneers in the Regular 8th Division

List of pals infantry battalions by regiment

Notes

References

Bibliography
 
 
 David Bilton, Hull Pals, 10th, 11th 12th and 13th Battalions East Yorkshire Regiment – A History of 92 Infantry Brigade, 31st Division, Barnsley: Pen & Sword, 2014, .
 
 Andrew Jackson, Accrington's Pals: The Full Story, Barnsley, Pen & Sword, 2013, . 

 
United Kingdom in World War I
Pals battalions
Pals battalions
Pals battalions